XHVG-FM is a commercial radio station located in Mexicali, Baja California, Mexico. Broadcasting on 103.3 FM, XHVG  is owned by MVS Radio and airs a Regional Mexican music format known as "La Mejor".

History 
XHVG came to the air in 1970, it was owned by Joaquín Vargas Gómez founder of MVS Radio, with the station carried the Stereorey format. In 2002 it was replaced by Best FM but continues to music in English. In 2003, Best FM in Mexicali stopped broadcasting and in its place came the group format of MVS Radio La Mejor, after XHCMS-FM 105.5, the frequency on which the signal of La Mejor, was sold to Grupo Imagen.

References

External links
Official website
La Mejor 103.3 official website

Radio stations in Mexicali
MVS Radio